Dante Frasnelli Tarter (6 January 1925 – 10 January 2020) was an Italian-Peruvian Catholic bishop.

Frasnelli Tarter was born in Italy and was ordained to the priesthood in 1952. He served as territorial prelate of Huari, Peru, before it became a diocese, from 1967 to 2001.In all period he served as a bishop he was known for his social work for the poor. He was loved for all people in Huari, specially for those who had little. He worked with the ONG “Caritas” which was encharged of receiving donations( food, clothes, toys) As soon as donations were received Bishop Dante will give it to all people who need it. He was also known for his hard work in evangelization, in all his time as a bishop he would ride his horse to all places around Huari, explaining people the love of God, and the importance of being good catholic.

Notes

1925 births
2020 deaths
Italian Roman Catholic bishops in South America
20th-century Roman Catholic bishops in Peru
Place of birth missing
Place of death missing
Italian expatriates in Peru
Roman Catholic bishops of Huarí